The 1931 population census in Bosnia and Herzegovina was the sixth census of the population of Bosnia and Herzegovina. On the territory of 51,564 km2 2,323,555 persons lived. The Kingdom of Yugoslavia conducted a population census on 31 March 1931.

Results by religion

Bosnia and Herzegovina

Results by administrative units 
The Kingdom was divided into Banovinas. Banovinas were divided into districts, and districts into municipalities. Below is a result of census by administrative units:

Absolute majority

Relative majority

Littoral Banovina

Vrbas Banovina

Drina Banovina

References 

Censuses in Bosnia and Herzegovina
1931 in Bosnia and Herzegovina
Bosnia